The Estadio Monumental de Maturín (Monumental Stadium of Maturin) is the largest stadium in Venezuela by seating capacity, with 52,000 spectators. It was one of the venues of the 2007 Copa America. It is also the home stadium of the Monagas Sport Club.

It is located in the Industrial Zone of Maturin.

Capacity 

The entire stadium is covered with individual seating. It has a parking for 3,786 vehicles, a commercial area of 26,381 square metres, 44 radio booths, 8 television studios, suites and presidential box, delegates' lounge, anti doping control room and press room, three elevators, a parking only authorities and players, two dressing rooms, dressing and locker rooms for referees for the security forces, ballboys and musical band.

Their positions are distributed as follows:

 Western sector: 8116
 Western sector 3 left: 2.977
 Western sector 3 right: 2,966
 North sector: 7719
 South sector: 7719
 Eastern sector: 11,389
 Eastern sector 3 left: 3,892
 Eastern sector 3 right: 3891

Total laid down: 48,669

 Written press: 506
 Radio and TV booths: 300
 Suite level 1: 560
 Suite level 2: 1,337
 Presidential box: 220
 Disabled: 204

Total capacity of this stadium: 52,000

Copa América 2007
The stadium was one of the venues of the Copa América 2007, and held the following matches:

References

Football venues in Venezuela
Copa América stadiums
Buildings and structures in Monagas
Buildings and structures in Maturín
2007 establishments in Venezuela